Cathey Peak is a peak in the Sacramento Mountains, in the south-central part of the U.S. State of New Mexico.

The Sunspot Solar Observatory is on the summit itself, and the site of this observatory incorporates the small town of Sunspot, less than one-half mile (0.8 km) to the northeast. The Apache Point Observatory is located on a promontory about one-half mile (0.8 km) south of the summit.

Both peaks lie on the high western crest of the Sacramento Mountains, and hence have gentle, forested eastern slopes, and a steep, high escarpment to the west, descending to the Tularosa Basin. Both peaks can be accessed using New Mexico Scenic Byway 6563 from Cloudcroft.

References 

Mountains of New Mexico
Landforms of Otero County, New Mexico
Mountains of Otero County, New Mexico